Mentaxya ignicollis, the red teff worm, is a species of moth in the family Noctuidae. It is a pest of teff in Ethiopia.

References

Noctuinae
Insect pests of millets